The Great National Assembly of the Serb People in Montenegro, commonly known as the Podgorica Assembly, was an ad hoc assembly convened in November 1918, after the end of World War I in the Kingdom of Montenegro. The assembly was held by the Montenegrin authorities with the goal of dethroning the Montenegrin Petrović-Njegoš dynasty in favour of the Serbian House of Karađorđević, in order to formalise the unification between the Serbian and Montenegrin kingdoms. It was organized by a committee appointed by the Serbian government. The two opposing sides at the assembly were the Whites who were in favour of an annexation-based unification, and the Greens who were in favour of a confederation-based unification. The assembly concluded the decision to merge Montenegro with Serbia, which subsequently led to the creation of the Kingdom of Yugoslavia soon after.

Prelude
The Montenegrin government capitulated to the forces of Austria-Hungary on 6 January 1916 during The Great War. King Nicholas I refused to sign capitulation and departed the country for allied Italy, where his daughter was married to the king. On 17 July 1917 the Yugoslav Committee and the Government of the Kingdom of Serbia signed the Corfu Declaration, which, accepted by the Allied Powers, laid the foundations for a South Slavic state. In 1918 the Serbian Royal Army took control of Montenegro from the Central Powers' occupation; Serbia, Italy, France, the United Kingdom, and the United States were assigned to provisionally occupy and establish control over Montenegro.

Montenegro had been planning and preparing for unification with Serbia for over 50 years; Nikola I wished to become the ruler of the united state. This project had failed in 1903, after which the population became divided in political blocks, for a united state (Serbia) or for confederation (Serbia and Montenegro). The last negotiations between Montenegro and Serbia started shortly before World War I in 1914, concerning military, economic and foreign affairs. The most important point of disagreement during negotiations was the position of Montenegro in the union: as an equal partner to Serbia or as a province of Serbia. In Montenegro the strongest supporter of unconditional union was future prime minister Andrija Radović, titled by the Serbian government which had been working on annexation of Montenegro from 1866. Since the beginning of October 1918, various initiatives were raised to formalize unification with the war drawing to a close. Even Nicholas I gave support to a new united Yugoslav confederation, but this position was still against Belgrade's wish of a united state. Various tiny assemblies in territory controlled by the Serbian army were organized similar to the ones in the former Austro-Hungarian lands.

On 15 October 1918 the Serbian government named a "Central Executive Committee for Unification of Serbia and Montenegro" consisting of four strong proponents of a union of the two states, two from Serbia and two from Montenegro, that would organize the process of unification. With this decision the Kingdom of Serbia abolished the legal Montenegro parliament, just like Austro-Hungary had done earlier, with the explanation: "Because 2/5 of parliament members are abroad, it is necessary to elect new".  This unconstitutional decision, supported by the Serbian military in Montenegro, was against an order of the king of Montenegro, for gathering of parliament on first day after armistice was signed.

Electoral rules
On 25 October 1918 in Berane, the city of one of the committee's members, the committee decided to schedule a nationwide election with new election laws created by the Central Executive Committee for Unification of Serbia and Montenegro. 165 members were elected to form a parliament called the "Great People's Assembly of the Serbian People in Montenegro" to decide about the form and process of unification of Montenegro with Serbia, as well as the rules of its election.

The people chose electors by secret ballot, who would subsequently nominate the assembly.
 Each captaincy elected 10 electors
 Each district (newly gained unrepresented territories from the Balkan Wars) elected 15 electors
 Each town below 5,000 residents (Bar, Ulcinj, Kolašin, Berane and Bijelo Polje) elected 5 electors and cities with 5,000 or more citizens (Cetinje, Podgorica, Pljevlja, Peć and Đakovica) elected 10 electors

The electors were the democratic holders of the national vote from the people, but they were supposed to elect the Members of the Parliament themselves in order to secure the balance and equally represent all levels of the community by profession, religious determination and ethnic affiliation.

Every male Montenegrin aged 25 or more had the right to be elected into the Parliament:
 Two MPs were to be elected from each captaincy 
 Three MPs from every district 
 One MP from every town and 
 Two MPs from every city 
During the Paris Peace Conference, Nicholas I's representative and future prime minister of Montenegro (de jure) General Gvozdenović attacked this election law: "Mere villages had been permitted to elect four deputies, while entire
districts had only sent one or two representatives". Other problems with the election were that voting was made without the voters' lists, and that the Serbian army didn't allow the opponents of union to enter Montenegro before elections ended

Election
Two organized lists were opposed:
White List – Metropolitan bishop Gavrilo Dožić of Peć
Green List – Špiro Tomanović

The Whites were opponents of the reigning King Nicholas I, presenting him as an enemy to democracy, the people and betrayer of his dynasty's original foundations. They were led by Metropolitan bishop Gavrilo Dožić of Peć (later to become the Metropolitan of the Metropolitanate of Montenegro and the Littoral in 1920), and stood for direct, immediate and unconditional unification with the Kingdom of Serbia. The Greens were pro-dynastic supporters of King Nicholas I and supported a conditional and loose unification of Montenegro with Serbia.

After quick but major preparations, the elections were held on 19 November 1918. The Whites won at all locations except Montenegrin capital Cetinje, but in Bijelo Polje, Plav and Gusinje instead of elections the electors were appointed by the local community, and due to the subsequent rapidly changing following acts elections were never properly repeated.

The result of the elections had become clear to international community before it was proclaimed. In a last push to protect an independent Montenegro, the Kingdom of Italy, whose king was married to a daughter of Montenegrin king Nicholas, tried to take Cetinje and proclaim restored Montenegrin state. The attack started from the Bay of Kotor, but the Italian forces withdrew after the possibility of war with Kingdom of Serbia and due to pressure of the other Allied Powers.

The electors then publicly nominated a session of the parliament with 165 MPs. 56 MPs had a PhD, 6 were teachers and priests, 25 were Clan Chieftains, 14 were agricultural workers and 3 youth. The several Green electors refused to show up and boycotted the assembly.

The parliament
The Great National Assembly was constituted on 24 November 1918 not in the Montenegro parliament which was in Cetinje, but in the Podgorica Tobacco Monopoly building. During that time Podgorica was the largest and most populated city in Montenegro. In two following sessions of 25 November 1918, the parliament elected its president, two vice-presidents and the Secretary.  parliament unanimously adopted a resolution with the following decisions:
To depose King Nicholas I Petrović-Njegoš and his dynasty from the Montenegrin throne
To unite Montenegro with the brotherly Serbia into a single state under the House of Karađorđević, and in such entity to then enter into a common Fatherland with our people under three names Serbs, Croats and Slovenes
To establish a National Executive Committee made up of five individuals, that shall handle the administrative affairs, until the unification of Serbia and Montenegro is complete
To announce the Assembly's decisions to:
the ex-King of Montenegro Nikola Petrović
the Government of the Kingdom of Serbia
the friendly Allies (the United States, Britain, France, and Italy), and all neutral countries

At the time, because of the threat of foreign claim of the liberated lands, detachments of Serbian army (with many volunteers from other nations of future Yugoslavia who helped liberate territories under Austria-Hungary, Italy and Nicholas I) were dispatched throughout the newly liberated territory (which was unrecognised as part of any state until Treaty of Versailles 1920. Because this territory did not belong to any recognised state, the threat of entry of foreign forces was annihilated until the unification was complete by the presence of the only recognised, organised army among South Slavs of Yugoslavia, Serbian army (with many Montenegrin Serb, Croat and Slovene volunteers).

The MPs called upon the long lasting desire to unite the Serb people from Montenegro with the one in Serbia, and sent a copy of the Montenegrin Crown to King Petar I Karađorđević with a delegation that went to Belgrade led by Metropolitan Dožić on 17 December 1918. In his 24 December speech for The Associated Press King Nicholas I repeated the Montenegrin wish to become part of a "Yugoslav confederation, but preserve its autonomy, independence and customs" 

The parliament continued its session until 29 November 1918, when the "Central Montenegrin Committee for Unification" of five members was appointed and sworn to duty.

Epilogue
After the Kingdom of Serbs, Croats and Slovenes was proclaimed, the historic entities including Montenegro remained, parallel to Serbia. The Great Serb People's Assembly convened for the last time on 27 December 1919 when it elected the Montenegrin delegation to the Collective National Representing Body of the Kingdom of Serbs, Croats and Slovenes that was to draft a Constitution.

The deposed King and his internationally recognized Government of the Kingdom of Montenegro in Exile in Neilly was informed of this by French intelligence. Nicholas discarded the decisions of the assembly, claiming it was illegal, calling upon the Constitution of Montenegro, and called forth the Montenegrins not to accept the annexation. Prime Minister Evgenije Popović wrote to the Great Powers in complaint.

The Greens, led by Krsto Zrnov Popović, supported by the Italians, changed their desire to include a completely independent Montenegrin state and resorted to rebellion. With slogan "For right, honour and the freedom of Montenegro", they raised on Christmas Eve of 7 January 1919 the Christmas Uprising, with an attempt to restore independent Montenegro. The international community opposed uprising and the Serbian forces quelled the rebellion in blood, raising the rebel sieges of completely cut-off Cetinje and Nikšić. The insurgents mostly found amnesty, but some form of little guerrilla resistance from continued until 1926.

During the Paris Peace Conference, a representative of Montenegro king was called to give a speech  in which he protested annexation, but for the Treaty of Versailles, only the representative of Yugoslav Montenegro was called. At these two conferences, the Kingdom of Serbs, Croats and Slovenes was internationally recognized, but the Montenegrin question itself was left to be later resolved because of a bloody conflict escalating in Montenegro.

The independence of Montenegro was recognized by the Great Powers until 1922 after which all states accepted the Yugoslav claim on this state. During the 1918–22 period, annexation was supported by France, independence by Italy, and Great Britain took their middle road with suppression report about method practised by Serbia and French generals (in Montenegro) Franchet d'Esperey and Venal in Montenegro.

Legacy
The state of Montenegro regained its independence in 2006 and the event was interpreted as a break of the assembly, initiating a controversy over its decisions. The minor ruling Social Democratic Party of Montenegro wanted to formally cancel the decisions of the Podgorica Assembly by the Parliament of Montenegro after the adoption of the new Constitution in late 2007. This was met with another controversy, as whether the decisions of the Podgorica Assembly were legal, as they were accepted as state decisions thus far, including opposition from the Liberal Party of Montenegro of the act, which upholds that abolishing a decision would automatically legitimize itself. The long-term Prime Minister Milo Djukanovic of the dominant Democratic Party of Socialists of Montenegro noted on the day of celebration of the victory in the independence referendum the people had abolished its decisions from 1918.

See also 

 Great People's Assembly of Serbs, Bunjevci and other Slavs in Banat, Bačka and Baranja

References

Sources

External links

 
 Facsimile of the decisions of the Podgorica Assembly

Kingdom of Montenegro
Kingdom of Serbia
Montenegro and World War I
History of the Serbs of Montenegro
History of the Serbs
Montenegro–Serbia relations
National unifications
Serbian nationalism in Montenegro
1918 conferences
November 1918 events